Iowa Highway 57 is a state highway that runs from west to east in northern Iowa.  Its western terminus is at U.S. Route 65 northeast of Iowa Falls.  Its eastern terminus is at an intersection with U.S. Highway 218, Iowa Highway 27, and Iowa Highway 58 in Cedar Falls. It currently follows much of U.S. Highway 20's old route from Cedar Falls to Iowa Falls.

Route description

Iowa Highway 57 begins at US 65 northeast of Iowa Falls and runs eastward along the Hardin County/Franklin County border.  It goes through Ackley, then turns north shortly to go through Austinville.  It turns eastward there and runs through Aplington before meeting Iowa 14 in Parkersburg.  It continues east through New Hartford, then after a brief south turn, turns east to go through Cedar Falls.  In the eastern part of Cedar Falls, near George Wyth Memorial State Park, Iowa Highway 57 ends when it meets US 218, Iowa 27, and Iowa 58.

History
At the time of designation, the highway went from Grundy Center northward to Cedar Falls.  In August 1932, the segment from Grundy Center to Parkersburg was renumbered as Iowa 14. In 1986, when U.S. Highway 20 was expanded to four lanes to the Black Hawk/Grundy County line, Iowa 57 assumed 20's old route from Cedar Falls to Parkersburg. When the final four lane segment of U.S. 20 through the Iowa River Greenbelt opened on August 22, 2003, Iowa 57 was extended to cover the remainder of U.S. 20's old route to U.S. 65.

Major intersections

References

External links

West end of Iowa 57 at Iowa Highway Ends
East end of Iowa 57 at Iowa Highway Ends

057
Transportation in Grundy County, Iowa
Transportation in Black Hawk County, Iowa
Cedar Falls, Iowa
U.S. Route 20